The Barcelona International Erotic Film Festival or FICEB (Festival Internacional de Cinema Eròtic de Barcelona in Catalan) is an annual Spanish pornographic film festival and awards ceremony. It is the oldest adult film festival in Europe.

The event dates from 1992. Since 1997, it has been held in the La Farga convention center in L'Hospitalet de Llobregat, a suburb of the Barcelona. In 2005, the event was recognized by the regional government of Catalonia, but, in 2006, the L'Hospitalet municipal government controversially voted not to renew the festival's contract, requiring it to seek a new location (Madrid) for 2007–08. The FICEB moved to Madrid in 2008 and was held at the Room Fabrik.

Compared to the analogous Hot d'Or film festival in Cannes, the Barcelona festival has been called less exclusive and more comprehensive. Besides film awards and star appearances, the five days of FICEB include hundreds of strip-tease and live sex shows, as well as a lingerie show and a sex product fair with adult toys. The event exists, in part, to promote the sex industry in Spain by promoting the domestic production of adult films and organizing discussion forums. At or above 50,000 people attended the festival in 2005, 2006, and 2007. The FICEB has served as launching pad for actresses, actors, and directors such as: Sophie Evans, Celia Blanco, Nacho Vidal, Max Cortés, Sara Bernat, and Toni Ribas.

The Mexico Erotic Festival is backed by the same group responsible for the Barcelona International Erotic Film Festival.

FICEB awards
The FICEB has three awards for different categories of pornographic films, the Ninfa (Nymph - where there are some twenty-eight categories) for heterosexual pornography, the HeatGay for gay pornography films and the Tacón de Aguja (High heel or Stiletto heel) for BDSM and sexual fetish films. The year 2002 was the first year with a "Short Film Competition X" at the FICEB, where the winner of that contest was endowed with 2,400 Euros and second place was awarded 1,200 Euros.

The following is a list of the winners in the major categories for the Ninfa awards only. A more complete list of winners can be found through the External Links listed below.

Ninfa award winners 2000–2004

Ninfa Award winners 2005–2008

2013 winners

 Best Actor of the Year - Rob Diesel
 Best Actress of the Year - Gigi Love
 Best Actor of the Year in Gay-themed Videos - Martin Mazza
 Best New Actress - Noemilk
 Best Porn Artist Personal Website - zazelparadise.com
 Best Webcamer of the Year - Carolina Abril
 Best Porn Content Company of the Year - Actrices del Porno
 Best New Porn Content Company - Explicital
 Best Adult Content Website - actricesdelpono.com
 Best Sponsor - FA Webmasters
 Best Director of the Year - Roberto Chivas
 Best Video Editor - Irina Vega
 Best Adult Content Media - Estrellas del Porno
 Best Series of the Year - La Mansión de Nacho Vidal (Actrices del Porno)
 Best Amateur Series of the Year - Arnaldo Series (Fakings)
 Best International Adult Content Company - Brazzers
 Honorary Prize Awarded by the Organization - Torbe
 Special Award of the Barcelona Erotic Show Klic-Klic - Katya Sambuca
 Best Actress Chosen by the Public - Amanda X
 Best Actor Chosen by the Public - Rafa García
 Best Spanish Adult Content Website Chosen by the Public - MiFacePorno.com

2014 winners
 Best Actor of the Year - David El Moreno
 Best Actress of the Year - Amarna Miller
 Best Actor in Gay Themed Movies - Alejandro Magno
 Best New Actress - Daytona X
 Best New Actor - Juan Lucho
 Best Director - Raúl Lora
 Best Porn Content Company - Actrices del Porno
 Best Porn Artist Personal Website - norabarcelona.com
 Best Gay Porn Content Company - LocuraGay
 Best Adult Content Website - actricesdelporno.com
 Best Webcamer - Silvia Rubí
 Best Adult Content Media - Conrad Son Show
 Best Gay Scene - El Masajista (LocuraGay)
 Best Series - Anal Divas by Franceska Jaimes (ADP)
 Best BDSM Scene - Light VS Hard (Red Devil X)
 Best Amateur Themed Series - Cástings Porno (ZasXXX)
 Best International Adult Content Company - Brazzers
 Best Actress Chosen by the Public - Carolina Abril
 Best Actor Chosen by the Public - Nacho Vidal
 Best Website Chosen by the Public - putalocura.com
 Best Gay Actor Chosen by the Public - Antonio Miracle
 Honorable Award by the Organization - Max Cortés
 Special Award - Bonnie Rotten

References

External links

 "FICEB - Festival Internacional de Cine Erótico de Barcelona" Official site
 Salón Erótico de Barcelona - new site for convention
 "FICEB - Film Festival Awards Won" List Awards 2000-2006
 
 2001 FICEB Award Nominees & Winners
 2002 FICEB Award Winners & Nominees
 2004 FICEB Award winners & nominees
 2006 Award Winners list
 2007 Award Winners list
 2008 Award Winners list
 2015 nominations
 "Los premios Ninfa abrirán el Salón Erótico de Barcelona"
 "Carolina Abril y Potro de Bilbao premios Ninfa como mejores actores porno"
 "Barcelona International Erotic Film Festival" awards listing at the Internet Movie Database
  "Hezea eta beroa: Euskalsex topaketaren antolatzaileek erotismoaren alorrera hedatu nahi omen dute hizkuntza normaltzeko ahalegina", Xabier G. Arguello, 2007-05-27, International Herald Tribune
 

Film festivals established in 1992
Film festivals in Catalonia
Culture in Barcelona
Erotic events
Pornographic film awards
Annual events in Spain
1992 establishments in Spain